Alapalawala East Grama Niladhari Division is a Grama Niladhari Division of the Udunuwara Divisional Secretariat of Kandy District of Central Province, Sri Lanka. It has Grama Niladhari Division Code 16.

Angunawela, Handessa, Angunawala and Piligalla are located within, nearby or associated with Alapalawala East.

Alapalawala East is a surrounded by the Yalegoda West, Piligalla West, Naranwala, Alapalawala West, Mampitiya and Rajagiriya Grama Niladhari Divisions.

Demographics

Ethnicity 
The Alapalawala East Grama Niladhari Division has a Sinhalese majority (80.6%) and a significant Sri Lankan Tamil population (18.6%). In comparison, the Udunuwara Divisional Secretariat (which contains the Alapalawala East Grama Niladhari Division) has a Sinhalese majority (72.7%) and a significant Moor population (24.4%)

Religion 
The Alapalawala East Grama Niladhari Division has a Buddhist majority (79.2%) and a significant Hindu population (13.1%). In comparison, the Udunuwara Divisional Secretariat (which contains the Alapalawala East Grama Niladhari Division) has a Buddhist majority (72.0%) and a significant Muslim population (24.5%)

References 

Grama Niladhari Divisions of Udunuwara Divisional Secretariat
Geography of Kandy District